Benya Krik is a fictional character from The Odesa Tales, a collection of short stories by Isaac Babel, the derived works and "fan fiction".

These stories primarily deal with the Jewish underworld of Moldavanka, a ghetto of Odesa, and the mob leader, Benya Krik, known as the King, a romanticized "gallant thug". His character was loosely based on the real gangster, Mishka Yaponchik.

These stories were the base of the 1927 silent film Benya Krik. The screenplay was published in 1926 in a book form titled Беня Крик (кино-повесть) ("Benya Krik (Cinema-Novel)").

In 1926-1928 Babel wrote a play Sunset loosely based on the story with the same name from The Odesa Tales. In 1990 a film  was shot based on the same story. The focus of the three works is not Benya himself, but his family.

A film The Art of Living in Odesa was released in 1989, directed by Georgi Yungvald-Khilkevich and based on The Odesa Tales.

It was shot in 1989 and premiered in 1990. ('Drayman' refers to Mendel Krik, the father of Benya Krik).

See also
Culture of Odesa

References

Fictional Russian Jews
Odesa in fiction
Fictional gangsters
Isaac Babel

ru:Беня Крик